CityConnect WIFI is a Municipal wireless network brand name run by Pinacl Solutions currently in operation in the cities of York, England and Aberdeen, Scotland. The concept is to turn the entire connected area into a Wireless Access Zone, with the ultimate goal of making the internet a universal service. To cover large parts of both cities, a wireless mesh network has been deployed relying the wireless WiFi signal of hundreds of routers mounted commonly to poles, lamp-posts and buildings. Pinacl works closely with City of York Council and Aberdeen City Council and as such, Pinacl acts as a wireless internet service provider.

Overview 
CityConnect WIFI first launched in 2014 across York City Centre with phase one of the WiFi solution was rolled out across the city centre and park and ride terminals. Based on the success of this network we have expanded coverage across the University of York and there are plans to expand further across the city. This network now sees around 2000 users per day and this figure continues to rise. Following on from this deployment we have since launched Aberdeen CityConnect across 31 publicly accessible Council buildings in the Granite City. A similar solution has also been rolled out in the City of Newport, with FREE public now available in over 50 Council buildings with a separate concession based network that has recently been deployed across key parts of the City Centre including Upper Dock St, Corn St, Skinner St, Riverfront Theatre, train station, information station, Cambrian Road, Newport Market and the bus station.

York 
Pinnacle, working in partnership with the City of York Council started trials of public WiFi beginning 2013, with strong publicity, the trial was a success and was later rolled out permanently under phase 1, this initially covered Coney Street; the main shopping street in York. WiFi range was later expanded into other streets, allowing for continual use with your connected device relaying signals to the nearest router, allowing for seamless connectivity whilst on the move. WiFI range has again since been expanded to cover the entire of York City Centre, the 6 Park and Ride sites, 14 council run libraries and 41 council owned buildings. WiFi within the city centre is split into 15 'Network Zones' relaying signals to the previous and next router in the sequence.

CityConnect WIFI Zones
 Zone 1 – 1 Bridge St Wall mount Lamp 
 Zone 1 – 13 Bridge St Wall mount Lamp 
 Zone 1 – 39 Micklegate Wall mount Lamp 
 Zone 2 – Station Rise (West Offices) 
 Zone 2 – Cedar Court Lamppost
 Zone 2 – 2 Rougier St Lamppost
 Zone 2 – Tanners Moat Lamppost
 Zone 3 – Stn Rise/Stn Ave CCTV Pole
 Zone 3 – Royal York Hotel Lamppost
 Zone 3 – York Stn Lamppost
 Zone 4 – 1 Museum St Lamppost
 Zone 4 – Museum St/Lendl Lamppost
 Zone 4 – Duncombe Place lamppost
 Zone 4 – Minster Yard (Left of Minster) lamppost 
 Zone 4 – Minster Yard (Right of Minster) lamppost 
 Zone 5 – 1 Davygate CCTV Pole
 Zone 5 – 14 Blake St Wall mount Lamp
 Zone 5 – 15 Davygate Wall mount Lamp
 Zone 5 – 26 Davygate Wall mount Lamp
 Zone 6 – 1 Parliament St CCTV Pole
 Zone 6 – 8 Parliament St Wall mount Lamp
 Zone 6 – 15 Parliament St Wall mount Lamp 
 Zone 6 – 21 Davygate CCTV Camera mount 
 Zone 7 – 1 Coopergate CCTV Pole
 Zone 7 – 6 Nessgate Wall mount Lamp
 Zone 7 – 1 Nessgate (Wall mount Lamp)
 Zone 7 – 4 Spurriergate CCTV Camera mount
 Zone 7 – 13 Market St Wall mount Lamp 
 Zone 8 – Mansion House Rooftop
 Zone 8 – 12 Coney St Wall mount Lamp 
 Zone 8 – 15 Coney St Wall mount Lamp 
 Zone 8 – 23 Coney St Wall mount Lamp 
 Zone 8 – 22 Lendl Wall mount Lamp
 Zone 8 – 1 Stonegate Wall mount Lamp 
 Zone 9 – 6 Grape Lane Wall mount Bracket 
 Zone 9 – 54 Low Petergate Wall mount Lamp 
 Zone 9 – 2 Minster Yard Lamppost
 Zone 10 – 17 Back Swinegate CCTV Camera mount 
 Zone 10 – 14 Swinegate CCTV Camera Mount 
 Zone 10 – 28 Stonegate CCTV Camera Mount
 Zone 10 – 1 Kings Square CCTV Camera Mount
 Zone 11 – 65 Goodramsgate Wall mount Lamp
 Zone 11 – 34 Goodramsgate Lamppost
 Zone 11 – 27 Goodramsgate Wall mount Lamp 
 Zone 11 – Deangate Lamppost
 Zone 12 – Silver St Wall mount Lamp
 Zone 12 – 10 Newgate Wall mount Lamp
 Zone 12 – 47 Shambles Wall mount Lamp 
 Zone 12 – 13 Shambles Wall mount Lamp 
 Zone 12 – 23 Shambles Wall mount Lamp 
 Zone 13 – 1 St Saviourgate CCTV Pole
 Zone 13 – 20 Pavement Lamppost
 Zone 13 – 10 Pavement Wall mount Lamp 
 Zone 14 – Museum Gardens

Aberdeen 
Free wi-fi is now available across 30 publicly-accessible Aberdeen City Council buildings, as part of the latest work to be delivered by the Accelerate Aberdeen programme. Again working in partnership with Pinacl Solutions and in the same technical style to York.

Aberdeen City Connect is available in 17 libraries, nine community and learning centres, Aberdeen Maritime Museum, Adventure Aberdeen and Marischal College, and is aimed at not only widening access to internet-based services across the city, but will also helping to address some of the digital divide and social inclusion. In addition, Aberdeen City Connect is also available in 17 NHS Grampian Hospitals.

Free public Wi-Fi is available in the below locations:

Libraries 

 Central Library
 Airyhall Library
 Bridge of Don Library
 Bucksburn Library
 Cornhill Library
 Cove Library
 Culter Library
 Cults Library & Learning Centre
 Dyce Library
 Ferryhill Library
 Kaimhill Library
 Kincorth Library
 Mastrick Library
 Northfield Library
 Tillydrone Library & Learning Centre
 Torry Library
 Woodside Library

Community Centres 

 Cummings Park Community Centre
 Dyce Community Learning Centre
 Froghall Community Hall
 Lord Provost Henry E Rae Community Centre
 Rosemount Community Centre
 Tillydrone Library & Learning Centre
 Torry Sports & Learning Centre
 Tullos Community Learning Centre
 Woodside Fountain Community Centre

Other Venues 

 Aberdeen Maritime Museum
 Adventure Aberdeen
 Marischal College Customer Access Point

Hospitals 

 Aberdeen Royal Infirmary
 Aberdeen Maternity Hospital
 Royal Aberdeen Childrens Hospital
 Woodend Hospital
 Royal Cornhill Hospital
 Aboyne Hospital
 Chalmers Hospital
 Fleming Hospital
 Fraserburgh Hospital
 Glen O' Dee Hospital
 Insch War Memorial Hospital
 Inverurie Hospital
 Jubilee Hospital
 Kincardine Hospital
 Peterhead Hospital
 Seafield Hospital
 Stephen Hospital
 Turner Memorial Hospital

Newport 
NewportCityConnect from Pinacl, will provide users with unlimited 24x7 free Wi-Fi access across key city centre locations including Upper Dock St, Corn St, Skinner St, Riverfront Theatre, Railway Station, Information Station, Cambrian Road, Newport Market and the Bus Station.

Visitors and residents can access NewportCityConnect from any wireless enabled device. This WiFi solution allows users to log in via social media or a simple registration form. Seamless login has been enabled so once the initial log in has been completed, users can get back online by simply opening up a browser when in range of the network.

The network has been designed to provide sufficient bandwidth to support streaming services such as BBC iPlayer. Pinacl launched a similar solution in the City of York last year which now sees around 2,000 users per day. Pinacl created the CityConnect brand specifically for public WiFi networks and solutions have been deployed for Aberdeen City Council, Stockport City Council and property development giants, British Land. Small retailers have also opted for CityConnect solutions to enhance their existing network with a user friendly social WiFi overlay.

References

Internet in England
Internet in Scotland
Municipal wireless networks